Sullu Marka (Aymara sullu miscarried (fetus), Quechua sullu miscarriage; unborn fetus; key for doors or boxes, Hispanicized spelling Sullumarca) is a  mountain in the Wansu mountain range in the Andes of Peru, about  high. It is situated in the Arequipa Region, La Unión Province, Huaynacotas District. It lies southwest of Hatun Sisiwa. Sullu Marka is also the name of the mountain just west of Hatun Sisiwa.

References 

Mountains of Peru
Mountains of Arequipa Region